The 1992 Girabola was the 14th season of top-tier football competition in Angola. C.D. Primeiro de Agosto were the defending champions.

The league comprised 16 teams, the bottom two of which were relegated.

Primeiro de Agosto were crowned champions, winning their 5th title, while Inter de Luanda and Benfica de Cabinda were relegated.

Amaral Aleixo of Sagrada Esperança finished as the top scorer with 20 goals.

Changes from the 1991 season
Relegated: Desportivo da Cuca, Desportivo de Saurimo
Promoted: Desportivo da Nocal, Inter da Huíla

League table

Results

Season statistics

Top scorer
 Amaral Aleixo

Champions

External links
Federação Angolana de Futebol

Girabola seasons
Angola
Angola